The Mount Alifana partula, scientific name Partula salifana, was a species of air-breathing tree snail, an arboreal pulmonate gastropod mollusk in the family Partulidae.

This species was endemic to Guam. It is now extinct.

References

Partula (gastropod)
Extinct gastropods
Taxonomy articles created by Polbot
Gastropods described in 1925